Noorddijk is a hamlet in the Dutch province of North Holland. It is a part of the municipality of Wester-Koggenland, and lies about 7 km southeast of Heerhugowaard.

The statistical area "Noorddijk", which also can include the surrounding countryside, has a population of around 420.

References

Populated places in North Holland